Israel competed at the 2009 Winter Universiade also known as the XXIV Winter Universiade, in Harbin, China.

Medals

Medals by sport

Figure skating

Ice dancing

References

Winter Universiade 
Nations at the 2009 Winter Universiade
Israel at the Winter Universiade